The Patna–Bhabua Road Intercity Express is an Express train belonging to East Central Railway zone that runs between  and  in India. It is currently being operated with 13249/13250 train numbers on a daily basis.

Service

The 13249/Patna–Bhabua Road InterCity Express has an average speed of 37 km/hr and covers 194 km in 5h 15m. The 13250/Bhabua Road–Patna InterCity Express has an average speed of 35 km/hr and covers 194 km in 5h 30m.

Route and halts 

The important halts of the train are:

Coach composition

The train has standard ICF rakes with max speed of 110 kmph. The train consists of 14 coaches:

 12 General
 2 Seating cum Luggage Rake

Traction

Both trains are hauled by a Mughalsarai Loco Shed-based WDM-3A diesel locomotive from Patna to Bhabua Road and vice versa.

Rake sharing

The trains shares its rake with

 13243/13244 Patna–Bhabua Road Intercity Express (via Gaya)
 53213/53214 Patna–Gaya Passenger
 53211/53212 Patna–Sasaram Passenger

See also 

 Patna Junction railway station
 Bhabua Road railway station
 Patna–Bhabua Road Intercity Express (via Gaya)
 Patna–Gaya Passenger
 Patna–Sasaram Passenger

Notes

References

External links 

 13249/Patna–Bhabua Road InterCity Express India Rail Info
 13250/Bhabua Road–Patna InterCity Express India Rail Info

Transport in Patna
Intercity Express (Indian Railways) trains
Rail transport in Bihar
Railway services introduced in 2013